Prolimnophila is a genus of crane fly in the family Limoniidae.

Distribution
Canada and United States

Species
P. areolata (Osten Sacken, 1860)

References

Limoniidae
Diptera of North America